Windsor glasses are a type of eyeglasses characterised by circular or nearly circular eyerims and a thin metal frame. The style emerged in the 19th century and first became popular in the 1880s. Traditionally the bridge of Windsor glasses is a "saddle" (a simple, arched piece of metal joining the two eyerims), and hence to prevent the glasses slipping off the face the temples are "riding bow temples" (a strongly arched wire that hooks around the ears); however, in a modern and extended definition, Windsors typically have a bridge with nose pads and gently curved temples.

In popular culture 
Notable people associated with Windsor glasses include John Lennon (and thus the glasses are sometimes referred to as "John Lennon glasses ") and Mahatma Gandhi, as well as the fictional character Harry Potter. Groucho Marx and Theodore Roosevelt also sometimes wore Windsor glasses, although they better remembered for their horn-rimmed Groucho glasses and rimless pince nez, respectively. Steve Jobs wore glasses with a thin frame and round lenses, but unlike proper Windsor glasses they were rimless.

Practical considerations 
The minimalist nature of Windsor glasses presents some pragmatic advantages over other styles.

Glasses that have eyerims with a particular customised shape may be subject to vendor lock-in, where the only company able to manufacture new lenses for a given frame is the same company from which that frame was purchased. In contrast, the circle is a basic geometric shape and may be found in the eyerims of many different brands (i.e. it is in the public domain). This means that Windsor glasses (or any glasses with circular eyerims) made from one brand may be compatible with the lenses made by another brand.

Eyeglass lenses were historically made of glass and had to be ground against an abrasive surface to fit the shape of the eyerims. Getting the lens to fit an irregularly shaped eyerim required skill and specialised equipment. The simplicity of carving a circle meant that circular lenses were generally cheaper to produce. Modern lenses are instead made of plastic and can be made to any shape with ease.

The thin frame requires less metal, and therefore less cost to produce, although the corollary of this is that Windsor glasses are more easily broken if crushed.

References 

Eyewear
Minimalist clothing